The 1973 Grote Prijs Jef Scherens was the ninth edition of the Grote Prijs Jef Scherens cycle race and was held on 16 September 1973. The race started and finished in Leuven. The race was won by Jan van Katwijk.

General classification

References

1973
1973 in road cycling
1973 in Belgian sport